The Fiat Pininfarina Cabriolet (tipo 118G) was a two-door, two passenger, front engine rear drive convertible manufactured by Pininfarina,  and marketed by Fiat across two generations (1959-1963, 1964-1966), superseding the Fiat 1200 Spider. 

By the end of manufacture in 1966, total production had reached 34,211 with sporting versions (1500 S/1600 S), equipped with OSCA built twin cam engines, reaching a production of 3089. The Cabriolet was superseded by the Fiat 124 Sport Spider, introduced in 1966.

First generation
Pininfarina had shown a similar, OSCA-powered convertible called the Fiat-OSCA 1500 GT at the 1958 Turin Motor Show. The two-seat 1200 Cabriolet also retained the chassis of the 1200 TV Trasformabile. Front suspension is independent with coil and wishbone, combined with a live, leaf sprung rear axle.

1500 S/1600 S
The 1200 was not fast enough to be considered a sports car, so Fiat decided to take a short cut to this market by using OSCA's existing twin cam engine design. Chief engineer Dante Giacosa initiated Fiat's relationship with OSCA in a July 1957 meeting with Ernesto Maserati. In November 1959 the 1500 Cabriolet appeared with this 1491 cc engine, fitted with twin Weber carburettors and developing . The Tipo 118 engine was a close relative of the tipo 372 DS unit fitted to the OSCA's MT4 racing car (as well as the later road-going OSCA 1600 GT2 and SP), although Fiat took over production at their Mirafiori factory - now with a cast-iron rather than the original aluminium block. OSCA bought engines built by Fiat for their own purposes, and fettled those units further. The new model was called the Fiat 1500 Cabriolet (tipo 118S) and received a wider (non-functional) air scoop on the bonnet, a rev counter, as well as the larger drum brakes from the larger 1800/2100 saloons, and 15-inch wheels. In July 1960 the name was changed to "Fiat 1500 S Cabriolet," and it now had disc brakes front and rear. About 1000 of the OSCA-engined 1500/1500 S models were built.

In mid-1962 this engine was replaced with one bored out by 2 mm to 1568 cc. The twin-cam four of the 1600 S (tipo 118SA) had  (100 hp SAE). These cars received a distinctive, asymmetric air intake until 1963 when the 1600 S was facelifted while the 1200 was replaced by the pushrod-engined 1500 Cabriolet.

In 1960 Pininfarina presented a coupé version of the 1500 Cabriolet. This model, built in small numbers and sold by Pininfarina themselves, received a smaller windscreen as well as a shortened bootlid to accommodate the larger rear windshield. It remained a strict two-seater and continued to be built with the 1600 engine and after the range was facelifted in 1963. Fiat also offered a removable hardtop for the Cabriolets.

Second generation
In 1961 the 1200 Saloon was replaced by the new, larger, 1300/1500. The 1200 and 1600 Coupés and Cabriolets continued to be built without major alterations until September 1963, when they were equipped with the larger 1.5 litre pushrod engine. The grille, previously two segments, was now a wider, single piece. The Fiat-engined 1500 (tipo 118H) was now also available with Pininfarina's limited production coupé bodywork. The O.S.C.A. engined 1600 S, with a twin cam 1568 cc engine developing  continued to be available albeit with the same new front end treatment as that of the 1500 Cabriolet. This was called the Fiat 1600 S Coupé/Cabriolet (tipo 118SB) and can easily be recognized by its additional lamps at the outer corners of the grille. New, lower engine mounts allowed the bonnets to be flatter.

In early 1965, the four-speed transmission was replaced with a five-speed unit, while the brakes received servo assistance. The range was replaced by the new 124 coupés and spiders in 1966, although the 1500 Coupé continued to be sold into 1967.

References

1200 Cabriolet
Rear-wheel-drive vehicles
Coupés
Convertibles
Cars introduced in 1959
1960s cars